This is a list of episodes from the 1994 television series Iron Man.

Series overview

Episodes

Season 1 (1994)

Season 2 (1995–96)

Crossovers

Incredible Hulk

Spider-Man

 Tony Stark also had a cameo in "The Spot" episode of Spider-Man.
 Although he never spoke, Iron Man had a few cameos in a few of the Fantastic Four episodes, including the Season 2 episodes "To Battle the Living Planet" and "Doomsday".

References

Iron Man episodes
Episodes
Iron Man episodes